Expressionism is a modernist movement, initially in poetry and painting, originating in Northern Europe around the beginning of the 20th century. Its typical trait is to present the world solely from a subjective perspective, distorting it radically for emotional effect in order to evoke moods or ideas. Expressionist artists have sought to express the meaning of emotional experience rather than physical reality.

Expressionism developed as an avant-garde style before the First World War. It remained popular during the Weimar Republic, particularly in Berlin. The style extended to a wide range of the arts, including expressionist architecture, painting, literature, theatre, dance, film and music.

The term is sometimes suggestive of angst. In a historical sense, much older painters such as Matthias Grünewald and El Greco are sometimes termed expressionist, though the term is applied mainly to 20th-century works. The Expressionist emphasis on individual and subjective perspective has been characterized as a reaction to positivism and other artistic styles such as Naturalism and Impressionism.

Etymology and history

While the word expressionist was used in the modern sense as early as 1850, its origin is sometimes traced to paintings exhibited in 1901 in Paris by obscure artist Julien-Auguste Hervé, which he called Expressionismes. An alternative view is that the term was coined by the Czech art historian Antonin Matějček in 1910 as the opposite of Impressionism: "An Expressionist wishes, above all, to express himself... (an Expressionist rejects) immediate perception and builds on more complex psychic structures... Impressions and mental images that pass through ... people's soul as through a filter which rids them of all substantial accretions to produce their clear essence [...and] are assimilated and condense into more general forms, into types, which he transcribes through simple short-hand formulae and symbols."

Important precursors of Expressionism were the German philosopher Friedrich Nietzsche (1844–1900), especially his philosophical novel Thus Spoke Zarathustra (1883–1892); the later plays of the Swedish dramatist August Strindberg (1849–1912), including the trilogy To Damascus 1898–1901, A Dream Play (1902), The Ghost Sonata (1907); Frank Wedekind (1864–1918), especially the "Lulu" plays Erdgeist (Earth Spirit) (1895) and Die Büchse der Pandora (Pandora's Box) (1904); the American poet Walt Whitman's (1819–1892) Leaves of Grass (1855–1891); the Russian novelist Fyodor Dostoevsky (1821–1881);  Norwegian painter Edvard Munch (1863–1944); Dutch painter Vincent van Gogh (1853–1890); Belgian painter James Ensor (1860–1949); and pioneering Austrian psychoanalyst Sigmund Freud (1856–1939).

In 1905, a group of four German artists, led by Ernst Ludwig Kirchner, formed Die Brücke (the Bridge) in the city of Dresden. This was arguably the founding organization for the German Expressionist movement, though they did not use the word itself. A few years later, in 1911, a like-minded group of young artists formed Der Blaue Reiter (The Blue Rider) in Munich. The name came from Wassily Kandinsky's Der Blaue Reiter painting of 1903. Among their members were Kandinsky, Franz Marc, Paul Klee, and August Macke. However, the term Expressionism did not firmly establish itself until 1913. Though mainly a German artistic movement initially and most predominant in painting, poetry and the theatre between 1910 and 1930, most precursors of the movement were not German. Furthermore, there have been expressionist writers of prose fiction, as well as non-German-speaking expressionist writers, and, while the movement had declined in Germany with the rise of Adolf Hitler in the 1930s, there were subsequent expressionist works.

Expressionism is notoriously difficult to define, in part because it "overlapped with other major 'isms' of the modernist period: with Futurism, Vorticism, Cubism, Surrealism and Dadaism." Richard Murphy also comments, “the search for an all-inclusive definition is problematic to the extent that the most challenging expressionists such as Kafka, Gottfried Benn and Döblin were simultaneously the most vociferous 'anti-expressionists.'"

What can be said, however, is that it was a movement that developed in the early twentieth century, mainly in Germany, in reaction to the dehumanizing effect of industrialization and the growth of cities, and that "one of the central means by which expressionism identifies itself as an avant-garde movement, and by which it marks its distance to traditions and the cultural institution as a whole is through its relationship to realism and the dominant conventions of representation." More explicitly, that the expressionists rejected the ideology of realism.

The term refers to an "artistic style in which the artist seeks to depict not objective reality but rather the subjective emotions and responses that objects and events arouse within a person". It is arguable that all artists are expressive but there are many examples of art production in Europe from the 15th century onward which emphasize extreme emotion. Such art often occurs during times of social upheaval and war, such as the Protestant Reformation, German Peasants' War, and Eighty Years' War between the Spanish and the Netherlands, when extreme violence, much directed at civilians, was represented in propagandist popular prints. These were often unimpressive aesthetically but had the capacity to arouse extreme emotions in the viewer.

Expressionism has been likened to Baroque by critics such as art historian Michel Ragon and German philosopher Walter Benjamin.  According to Alberto Arbasino, a difference between the two is that "Expressionism doesn't shun the violently unpleasant effect, while Baroque does. Expressionism throws some terrific 'fuck yous', Baroque doesn't. Baroque is well-mannered."

Notable Expressionists 

Some of the style's main visual artists of the early 20th century were:
 Armenia: Martiros Saryan
 Australia: Sidney Nolan, Charles Blackman, John Perceval, Albert Tucker, and Joy Hester
 Austria: Richard Gerstl, Egon Schiele, Oskar Kokoschka, Josef Gassler and Alfred Kubin
 Belgium: Marcel Caron, Anto Carte, and Auguste Mambour, and the Flemish Expressionists: Constant Permeke, Gustave De Smet, Frits Van den Berghe, James Ensor, Albert Servaes, Floris Jespers and Gustave Van de Woestijne.
 Brazil: Anita Malfatti, Cândido Portinari, Di Cavalcanti, Iberê Camargo and Lasar Segall.
 Denmark: Einer Johansen
 Estonia: Konrad Mägi, Eduard Wiiralt, Kuno Veeber
 Finland: Tyko Sallinen, Alvar Cawén, and Wäinö Aaltonen.
 France: Frédéric Fiebig, Georges Rouault, Georges Gimel, Gen Paul, Marie-Thérèse Auffray, Jacques Démoulin and Bernard Buffet.
 Germany: Ernst Barlach, Max Beckmann, Fritz Bleyl, Heinrich Campendonk, Otto Dix, Conrad Felixmüller, George Grosz, Erich Heckel, Carl Hofer, Max Kaus, Ernst Ludwig Kirchner, Käthe Kollwitz, Wilhelm Lehmbruck, Elfriede Lohse-Wächtler, August Macke, Franz Marc, Ludwig Meidner, Paula Modersohn-Becker, Otto Mueller, Gabriele Münter, Rolf Nesch, Emil Nolde, Max Pechstein, Christian Rohlfs, Karl Schmidt-Rottluff and Georg Tappert.
 Greece: George Bouzianis
 Hungary: Tivadar Kosztka Csontváry
 Iceland: Einar Hákonarson
 Ireland: Jack B. Yeats
 Indonesia: Affandi
 Italy: Amedeo Modigliani, Emilio Giuseppe Dossena
 Japan: Kōshirō Onchi
 Mexico: Mathias Goeritz (German émigré to Mexico), Rufino Tamayo
 Netherlands: Willem Hofhuizen, Herman Kruyder, Jan Sluyters, Vincent van Gogh, Jan Wiegers and Hendrik Werkman
 Norway: Edvard Munch, Kai Fjell
 Poland: Henryk Gotlib
 Portugal: Mário Eloy, Amadeo de Souza Cardoso
 Russia: Wassily Kandinsky, Marc Chagall, Chaïm Soutine, Alexej von Jawlensky, Natalia Goncharova, Mstislav Dobuzhinsky, and Marianne von Werefkin (Russian-born, later active in Germany and Switzerland).
 Romania: Horia Bernea
 Serbia: Nadežda Petrović
 South Africa: Maggie Laubser, Irma Stern
 Sweden: Leander Engström, Isaac Grünewald, Axel Törneman
 Switzerland: Carl Eugen Keel, Cuno Amiet, Paul Klee
 Ukraine: Alexis Gritchenko (Ukraine-born, most active in France), Vadim Meller
United Kingdom: Francis Bacon, Frank Auerbach, Leon Kossoff, Lucian Freud, Patrick Heron, John Hoyland, Howard Hodgkin, John Walker
 United States: Ivan Albright, David Aronson, Milton Avery, Leonard Baskin, George Biddle, Hyman Bloom, Peter Blume, Charles Burchfield, David Burliuk, Stuart Davis, Lyonel Feininger, Wilhelmina Weber Furlong, Elaine de Kooning, Willem de Kooning, Beauford Delaney, Arthur G. Dove, Norris Embry, Philip Evergood, Kahlil Gibran, William Gropper, Philip Guston, Marsden Hartley, Albert Kotin, Yasuo Kuniyoshi, Rico Lebrun, Jack Levine, Alfred Henry Maurer, Robert Motherwell, Alice Neel, Abraham Rattner, Esther Rolick, Ben Shahn, Harry Shoulberg, Joseph Stella, Harry Sternberg, Henry Ossawa Tanner, Dorothea Tanning, Steffen Thomas, Wilhelmina Weber, Max Weber, Hale Woodruff, Karl Zerbe.

Groups of painters
The style originated principally in Germany and Austria. There were a number of groups of expressionist painters, including Der Blaue Reiter and Die Brücke. Der Blaue Reiter (The Blue Rider, named for a painting) was based in Munich and Die Brücke was originally based in Dresden (although some members later relocated to Berlin). Die Brücke was active for a longer period than Der Blaue Reiter, which was only together for a year (1912). The Expressionists were influenced by various artists and sources including Edvard Munch, Vincent van Gogh, and African art. They were also aware of the work being done by the Fauves in Paris, who influenced Expressionism's tendency toward arbitrary colours and jarring compositions. In reaction and opposition to French Impressionism, which emphasized the rendering of the visual appearance of objects, Expressionist artists sought to portray emotions and subjective interpretations. It was not important to reproduce an aesthetically pleasing impression of the artistic subject matter, they felt, but rather to represent vivid emotional reactions by powerful colours and dynamic compositions. Kandinsky, the main artist of Der Blaue Reiter group, believed that with simple colours and shapes the spectator could perceive the moods and feelings in the paintings, a theory that encouraged him towards increased abstraction.

The ideas of German expressionism influenced the work of American artist Marsden Hartley, who met Kandinsky in Germany in 1913. In late 1939, at the beginning of World War II, New York City received a great number of major European artists. After the war, Expressionism influenced many young American artists. Norris Embry (1921–1981) studied with Oskar Kokoschka in 1947 and during the next 43 years produced a large body of work in the Expressionist tradition.  Norris Embry has been termed "the first American German Expressionist".  Other American artists of the late 20th and early 21st century have developed distinct styles that may be considered part of Expressionism. Another prominent artist who came from the German Expressionist "school" was Bremen-born Wolfgang Degenhardt. After working as a commercial artist in Bremen, he migrated to Australia in 1954 and became quite well known in the Hunter Valley region.

After World War II, figurative expressionism influenced worldwide a large number of artists and styles. In the U.S., American Expressionism and American Figurative Expressionism, particularly Boston Expressionism, were an integral part of American modernism around the Second World War. Thomas B. Hess wrote that "the ‘New figurative painting’ which some have been expecting as a reaction against Abstract Expressionism was implicit in it at the start, and is one of its most lineal continuities."
 Major figurative Boston Expressionists included: Karl Zerbe, Hyman Bloom, Jack Levine, David Aronson. The Boston Expressionists persisted after World War II despite their marginalization by the development of abstract expressionism centered in New York City, and are currently in the third generation.
New York Figurative Expressionism of the 1950s represented New York figurative artists such as Robert Beauchamp, Elaine de Kooning, Robert Goodnough, Grace Hartigan, Lester Johnson, Alex Katz, George McNeil (artist), Jan Muller, Fairfield Porter, Gregorio Prestopino, Larry Rivers and Bob Thompson.
 Lyrical Abstraction, Tachisme of the 1940s and 1950s in Europe represented by artists such as Georges Mathieu, Hans Hartung, Nicolas de Staël and others.
 Bay Area Figurative Movement represented by early figurative expressionists from the San Francisco area Elmer Bischoff, Richard Diebenkorn, and David Park. The movement from 1950 to 1965 was joined by Theophilus Brown, Paul Wonner, Hassel Smith, Nathan Oliveira, Jay DeFeo, Joan Brown, Manuel Neri, Frank Lobdell, and Roland Peterson.
 Abstract expressionism of the 1950s represented American artists such as Louise Bourgeois, Hans Burkhardt, Mary Callery, Nicolas Carone, Willem de Kooning, Jackson Pollock, Philip Guston, and others that participated with figurative expressionism.
Sōsaku-hanga (創作版画 "creative prints") was an expressionist woodblock print movement in early 20th century Japan. The movement was characterized by the work of Kanae Yamamoto (artist), Kōshirō Onchi, and many others.
In the United States and Canada, Lyrical Abstraction beginning during the late 1960s and the 1970s. Characterized by the work of Dan Christensen, Peter Young, Ronnie Landfield, Ronald Davis, Larry Poons, Walter Darby Bannard, Charles Arnoldi, Pat Lipsky and many others.
Neo-expressionism was an international revival style that began in the late 1970s

Representative paintings

In other arts
The Expressionist movement included other types of culture, including dance, sculpture, cinema and theatre.

Dance

Exponents of expressionist dance included Mary Wigman, Rudolf von Laban, and Pina Bausch.

Sculpture
Some sculptors used the Expressionist style, as for example Ernst Barlach. Other expressionist artists known mainly as painters, such as Erich Heckel, also worked with sculpture.

Cinema

There was an Expressionist style in German cinema, important examples of which are Robert Wiene's The Cabinet of Dr. Caligari (1920), The Golem: How He Came into the World (1920), Fritz Lang's Metropolis (1927) and F. W. Murnau's Nosferatu, a Symphony of Horror (1922) and The Last Laugh (1924). The term "expressionist" is also sometimes used to refer to stylistic devices thought to resemble those of German Expressionism, such as film noir cinematography or the style of several of the films of Ingmar Bergman. More generally, the term expressionism can be used to describe cinematic styles of great artifice, such as the technicolor melodramas of Douglas Sirk or the sound and visual design of David Lynch's films.

Literature

Journals
Two leading Expressionist journals published in Berlin were Der Sturm, published by Herwarth Walden starting in 1910, and Die Aktion, which first appeared in 1911 and was edited by Franz Pfemfert. Der Sturm published poetry and prose from contributors such as Peter Altenberg, Max Brod, Richard Dehmel, Alfred Döblin, Anatole France, Knut Hamsun, Arno Holz, Karl Kraus, Selma Lagerlöf, Adolf Loos, Heinrich Mann, Paul Scheerbart, and René Schickele, and writings, drawings, and prints by such artists as Kokoschka, Kandinsky, and members of Der blaue Reiter.

Drama

The artist and playwright Oskar Kokoschka's 1909 playlet, Murderer, The Hope of Women is often termed the first expressionist drama. In it, an unnamed man and woman struggle for dominance. The man brands the woman; she stabs and imprisons him. He frees himself and she falls dead at his touch. As the play ends, he slaughters all around him (in the words of the text) "like mosquitoes." The extreme simplification of characters to mythic types, choral effects, declamatory dialogue and heightened intensity all would become characteristic of later expressionist plays. The German composer Paul Hindemith created an operatic version of this play, which premiered in 1921.

Expressionism was a dominant influence on early 20th-century German theatre, of which Georg Kaiser and Ernst Toller were the most famous playwrights. Other notable Expressionist dramatists included Reinhard Sorge, Walter Hasenclever, Hans Henny Jahnn, and Arnolt Bronnen. Important precursors were the Swedish playwright August Strindberg and German actor and dramatist Frank Wedekind. During the 1920s, Expressionism enjoyed a brief period of influence in American theatre, including the early modernist plays by Eugene O'Neill (The Hairy Ape, The Emperor Jones and The Great God Brown), Sophie Treadwell (Machinal) and Elmer Rice (The Adding Machine).

Expressionist plays often dramatise the spiritual awakening and sufferings of their protagonists. Some utilise an episodic dramatic structure and are known as Stationendramen (station plays), modeled on the presentation of the suffering and death of Jesus in the Stations of the Cross. August Strindberg had pioneered this form with his autobiographical trilogy To Damascus. These plays also often dramatise the struggle against bourgeois values and established authority, frequently personified by the Father. In Sorge's The Beggar, (Der Bettler), for example, the young hero's mentally ill father raves about the prospect of mining the riches of Mars and is finally poisoned by his son. In Bronnen's Parricide (Vatermord), the son stabs his tyrannical father to death, only to have to fend off the frenzied sexual overtures of his mother.

In Expressionist drama, the speech may be either expansive and rhapsodic, or clipped and telegraphic. Director Leopold Jessner became famous for his expressionistic productions, often set on stark, steeply raked flights of stairs (having borrowed the idea from the Symbolist director and designer, Edward Gordon Craig). Staging was especially important in Expressionist drama, with directors forgoing the illusion of reality to block actors in as close to two-dimensional movement. Directors also made heavy use of lighting effects to create stark contrast and as another method to heavily emphasize emotion and convey the play or a scene's message.

German expressionist playwrights:
 Georg Kaiser (1878)
 Ernst Toller (1893–1939)
 Hans Henny Jahnn (1894–1959)
 Reinhard Sorge (1892–1916)
 Bertolt Brecht (1898–1956)

Playwrights influenced by Expressionism:
 Seán O'Casey (1880–1964)
 Eugene O'Neill (1885–1953)
 Elmer Rice (1892–1967)
 Tennessee Williams (1911–1983)
 Arthur Miller (1915–2005)
 Samuel Beckett (1906–1989)

Poetry
Among the poets associated with German Expressionism were:
 Jakob van Hoddis
 Georg Trakl
 Walter Rheiner
 Gottfried Benn
 Georg Heym
 Else Lasker-Schüler
 Ernst Stadler
 August Stramm
 Rainer Maria Rilke (1875–1926): The Notebooks of Malte Laurids Brigge (1910)
 Geo Milev
Other poets influenced by expressionism:
 T. S. Eliot
 Rudolf Broby-Johansen
 Tom Kristensen
 Pär Lagerkvist
 Edith Södergran

Prose
In prose, the early stories and novels of Alfred Döblin were influenced by Expressionism, and Franz Kafka is sometimes labelled an Expressionist.
Some further writers and works that have been called Expressionist include:

 Franz Kafka (1883–1924): "The Metamorphosis" (1915), The Trial (1925), The Castle (1926)
 Alfred Döblin (1878–1957): Berlin Alexanderplatz (1929)
 Wyndham Lewis (1882–1957)
 Djuna Barnes (1892–1982): Nightwood (1936)
 Malcolm Lowry (1909–1957): Under the Volcano (1947)
 Ernest Hemingway
 James Joyce (1882–1941): "The Nighttown" section of Ulysses (1922)
 Patrick White (1912–1990)
 D. H. Lawrence
 Sheila Watson: Double Hook
 Elias Canetti: Auto-da-Fé
 Thomas Pynchon
 William Faulkner
 James Hanley (1897–1985)
Raul Brandão (1867–1930): Húmus (1917)

Music

The term expressionism "was probably first applied to music in 1918, especially to Schoenberg", because like the painter Kandinsky he avoided "traditional forms of beauty" to convey powerful feelings in his music. Arnold Schoenberg, Anton Webern and Alban Berg, the members of the Second Viennese School, are important Expressionists (Schoenberg was also an expressionist painter).  Other composers that have been associated with expressionism are Krenek (the Second Symphony), Paul Hindemith (The Young Maiden), Igor Stravinsky (Japanese Songs), Alexander Scriabin (late piano sonatas) (Adorno 2009, 275). Another significant expressionist was Béla Bartók in early works, written in the second decade of the 20th century, such as Bluebeard's Castle (1911), The Wooden Prince (1917), and The Miraculous Mandarin (1919). Important precursors of expressionism are Richard Wagner (1813–1883), Gustav Mahler (1860–1911), and Richard Strauss (1864–1949).

Theodor Adorno describes expressionism as concerned with the unconscious, and states that "the depiction of fear lies at the centre" of expressionist music, with dissonance predominating, so that the "harmonious, affirmative element of art is banished" (Adorno 2009, 275–76). Erwartung and Die Glückliche Hand, by Schoenberg, and Wozzeck, an opera by Alban Berg (based on the play Woyzeck by Georg Büchner), are examples of Expressionist works. If one were to draw an analogy from paintings, one may describe the expressionist painting technique as the distortion of reality (mostly colors and shapes) to create a nightmarish effect for the particular painting as a whole.  Expressionist music roughly does the same thing, where the dramatically increased dissonance creates, aurally, a nightmarish atmosphere.

Architecture

In architecture, two specific buildings are identified as Expressionist: Bruno Taut's Glass Pavilion of the Cologne Werkbund Exhibition (1914), and Erich Mendelsohn's Einstein Tower in Potsdam, Germany completed in 1921. The interior of Hans Poelzig's Berlin theatre (the Grosse Schauspielhaus), designed for the director Max Reinhardt, is also cited sometimes. The influential architectural critic and historian Sigfried Giedion, in his book Space, Time and Architecture (1941), dismissed Expressionist architecture as a part of the development of functionalism. In Mexico, in 1953, German émigré Mathias Goeritz published the Arquitectura Emocional ("Emotional Architecture") manifesto with which he declared that "architecture's principal function is emotion". Modern Mexican architect Luis Barragán adopted the term that influenced his work. The two of them collaborated in the project Torres de Satélite (1957–58) guided by Goeritz's principles of Arquitectura Emocional. It was only during the 1970s that Expressionism in architecture came to be re-evaluated more positively.

See also
Post-expressionism
New Objectivity
History of Painting
Western Painting

References

Further reading
Antonín Matějček cited in Gordon, Donald E. (1987). Expressionism: Art and Idea, p. 175. New Haven: Yale University Press. 
Frank Krause (ed.), Expressionism and Gender / Expressionismus und Geschlecht. Göttingen: V&R unipress, 2010, ISBN 3899717171 
Jonah F. Mitchell (Berlin, 2003). Doctoral thesis Expressionism between Western modernism and Teutonic Sonderweg. Courtesy of the author.
Friedrich Nietzsche (1872). The Birth of Tragedy Out of The Spirit of Music. Trans. Clifton P. Fadiman. New York: Dover, 1995. .
Judith Bookbinder, Boston modern: figurative expressionism as alternative modernism, (Durham, N.H.: University of New Hampshire Press; Hanover: University Press of New England, ©2005.) , 
Bram Dijkstra, American expressionism: art and social change, 1920–1950, (New York: H.N. Abrams, in association with the Columbus Museum of Art, 2003.) , 
Ditmar Elger Expressionism-A Revolution in German Art  
Paul Schimmel and Judith E Stein, The Figurative fifties: New York figurative expressionism, The Other Tradition (Newport Beach, California: Newport Harbor Art Museum: New York: Rizzoli, 1988.)  
 Marika Herskovic, American Abstract and Figurative Expressionism: Style Is Timely Art Is Timeless (New York School Press, 2009.) .
Lakatos Gabriela Luciana, Expressionism Today, University of Art and Design Cluj Napoca, 2011

External links

Hottentots in tails A turbulent history of the group by Christian Saehrendt at signandsight.com
German Expressionism  A free resource with paintings from German expressionists (high-quality).

 
German literary movements